Montserrat, also known as Montserrat d'Alcalà, is a municipality in the comarca of Ribera Alta in the Valencian Community, Spain.

Cultural event

 International week of Chamber Music of Montserrat: Since 1981, the town of Montserrat has held the “International week of Chamber Music”. Many renowned artists with extensive musical backgrounds perform at the festival.

References

Municipalities in the Province of Valencia
Ribera Alta (comarca)